Raksi (Devanagari:रक्सी) or Rakshi (Bantawa language: Hengmawa/Hengma, Limbu language: Sijongwaa aara, Nepal Bhasa: aila) is the Nepali term for a traditional distilled alcoholic beverage in Nepal, India (Darjeeling, Sikkim) and Tibet. It is often made at home.

Raksi is a strong drink, clear like vodka or gin, tasting somewhat like Japanese sake. It is usually made from kodo millet (kodo) or rice; different grains produce different flavors.  It is made by distilling a chhaang, a brewed alcoholic drink.
The Limbus and Kirati people , for whom it is a traditional beverage, drink tongba and raksi served with pieces of pork, water buffalo or goat meat sekuwa. For the Newars, aila is indispensable during festivals and various religious rituals as libation, prasad or sagan.

In CNN's list of the world's 50 most delicious drinks, raksi was ranked 41st and was described as follows: "made from millet or rice, raksi is strong on the nose and sends a burning sensation straight down your throat that resolves itself into a surprisingly smooth, velvety sensation. Nepalese drink this home brew to celebrate festivals, though some think that the prized drink itself is the reason to celebrate." 

Because of its popularity, various temperance movements exist in Nepal, including various women's groups. Raksi, however, remains an important requirement of various religious rituals and social events, due in part perhaps to its antiseptic properties.

GC-MS based metabolomics revealed medicinal compounds present in raksi collected from high altitudes of Singalila Ridge of the Himalayas. Study claims raksi contains compounds which are useful as a remedy of high altitudes sickness.

Serving

Raksi is often served in a bhatti glass and during special occasions, the drink is poured from a great height via a pitcher with a small spout, making an entertaining spectacle.

Production
Raksi is produced, sold and mostly consumed at rustic distilleries scattered around the countryside. Usually it is not aged before consumption. A large amount of wood is used in the distillation process.

See also
 Alcohol in Nepal
 Ara, a Bhutanese drink
 Chhaang, a Tibetan and Nepalese drink
 List of Tibetan dishes

References

External links
 Traditional way of making rice wine in Nepal

Alcohol in Nepal
Indian drinks
Nepalese drinks
Tibetan cuisine
Distilled drinks
Rice wine
Traditional Indian alcoholic beverages